Nicholas Warren Mira (born August 25, 2000) is an American record producer from Richmond, Virginia, who is part of the producer collective Internet Money, a record label he co-founded with fellow producer Taz Taylor. He gained notoriety for developing the sound of late rapper Juice Wrld, including the songs "Lucid Dreams," "Bandit", and "Smile". He also worked with rapper Lil Tecca's "Ransom" and took a part in Internet Money's single "Lemonade." Mira's work consists primarily of hip-hop instrumentals, and he has contributed production to the Internet Money collective album B4 the Storm (2020).

Early life
As a child, Mira played the guitar and later learned to play the keyboard and piano. He began to focus on producing at the age of 13, and he cites Pharrell Williams as an influence. Mira describes his musical style as "melodic" and "ambient". He graduated from James River High School in 2019. Initially, Mira had held the goal of becoming a producer by selling his beats as if they were standalone tracks, but noted that he had very little knowledge about selling music.

Career
Mira first came in contact with producers Taz Taylor and DT through a Twitch stream in 2016, forming relationships with them based on their common method of selling and promoting their beats on platforms such as YouTube and SoundCloud. The trio proceeded to join forces in a collective label that would become what is now known as Internet Money, whose mission is to bring awareness to lesser known producers while uniting them with potential collaborators and artists.

While Mira began his producing career by primarily selling beats online, he has noted that his methods have changed over time, stating that creating a "good time and vibe" removes pressure from the creation of music.

In 2017, he, along with Taz Taylor and Dex Duncan, got his first major placement in XXXTentacion's Trippie Redd-assisted single "Fuck Love". It entered at number 41 on the US Billboard Hot 100 and eventually peaked at number 28 after X's death. On March 29, 2019, the song became the most streamed song ever on the streaming platform SoundCloud with 206 million streams. Mira began working with Juice Wrld after becoming acquainted with him through their mutual friend and fellow producer, Sidepce. "Lucid Dreams" was created after Mira produced the instrumental and sent it to Juice Wrld, who recorded vocals. The song peaked at number two on the Billboard Hot 100, has sold over 14 million certified units worldwide and was certified 5-times platinum by the Recording Industry Association of America.

Mira met Chicago rapper Jarad Higgins, known professionally as Juice WRLD, in 2016 through their mutual friend Sidepce, who also eventually became a producer for Internet Money. While Juice WRLD would proceed to debut several albums at number one on the Billboard 200 charts, Mira stated at the time that he believed the rapper "had like 300 followers on Soundcloud". Mira began to send beats to Juice WRLD online, and helped produce the tracks All Girls Are the Same, Lucid Dreams, Lean Wit Me, I'm Still, Candles, Used To, Hurt Me, End Of the Road, and I'll Be Fine on his 2018 debut album Goodbye and Good Riddance.

He was accused of plagiarizing "Lean wit Me" (performed by Juice Wrld), which he denied and later demonstrated the production of the song through a video published by his Internet Money record label on YouTube. Mira said "I created Juice Wrld's 'Lean Wit Me' beat from scratch. I played the guitar live in the beat, I programmed the drums and then I sent the beat for Juice to record to and make the song — just like how we always do."

Mira and Juice WRLD's working relationship continued on the 2019 commercial project Death Race For Love. After the success of Goodbye and Good Riddance, Mira continued to frequently create and send collections of beats to the rapper, and estimated that the duo had over 100 unreleased songs in 2019. Mira noted that the project represented a step forward in both Juice WRLD's and Mira's artistry, and attributed the development of their sound to the experience they had gained by working with each other. Mira also credited hardcore rock bands as influences for the album's sound. On March 8, 2019, Death Race For Love was officially released, on which Mira contributed production for four tracks, including commercial standouts Empty and Robbery. The album reached number one on the Billboard 200 chart on March 14, 2019, with first-week sales of 165,000 album equivalents sold.

In 2016, together with Taz Taylor, he co-founded the producer group and record label Internet Money, which has a joint venture with Alamo Records and Interscope Records. He also produced Lil Tecca's "Ransom" with Taz Taylor, which peaked at number four on the Billboard Hot 100. Later that year, he worked with Post Malone on the track "On the Road" (featuring Meek Mill and Lil Baby), off Malone's album, Hollywood's Bleeding, peaking at number 22 on the Billboard Hot 100.

In 2020, Mira produced a variety of songs on Juice WRLD's first posthumous album, "Legends Never Die", including "Smile" with the Weeknd, which was added to updated version of the album in August 2020. Mira also produced tracks for other artists including "Lemonade", a collaboration with Gunna featuring Don Toliver and Nav, produced and released with Internet Money. The track later become a hit single worldwide, peaking at number one in the United Kingdom and the top ten of the Hot 100.

Later during 2020, Mira contributed to the production of 10 songs on the collaborative Internet Money album B4 The Storm, which peaked at number one on the US Billboard 200 chart. The album included frequent collaborators Lil Tecca, TyFontaine, and 24kGoldn, all of whom Mira has continued to produce for to date.

Musical style 
While Mira has generally created beats for hip-hop artists, he has ventured into other styles and genres as well, and has produced on Machine Gun Kelly's pop-punk album Tickets to My Downfall. Mira has described his production style as "melodic", "dynamic", and "spacious". He has credited inspiration to artists Pharrell Williams, Kanye West, Metro Boomin, Lex Luger, and Sonny Digital, who have each made a significant impact on hip-hop production.

Influence:

Along with other fellow Internet Money members, Mira has been credited by some with the rise in popularity of "type beats", which aim to increase the popularity of an instrumental by associating it with well-known artists. While this has sparked some controversy around Internet Money's marketing methods, Mira has explained that his creative process is focused mainly on what he finds appealing, and that the "type beat" method used to tag artists is only based on artists he feels would fit on his instrumental.

As someone who began producing at a young age, Mira has commented on the popularity of Digital Audio Workstation software among the youth population, stating that "producing is the new video game."

Mira has advocated for the importance of working with smaller, up-and-coming artists, in order to build their fan bases and allow them to grow along with the Internet Money label. He has also discussed the value of working with artists in the studio as opposed to virtually, regardless of the size or success of the artist.

Production discography

Charted songs

Production credits

2017

XXXTentacion - 17

8. "Fuck Love" (featuring Trippie Redd)

Killa Fonic - Lama Crima

6. "Aka" (featuring Super ED, Nane & O.G. EastBull)

2018

Lil Skies - Life of a Dark Rose

1. "Welcome to the Rodeo" 
12. "Strictly Business"

Hella Sketchy - Stupid

1. "Stupid"

Tory Lanez - Love Me Now?

1. "IF iT Ain'T rIGHt" (featuring A Boogie wit da Hoodie) )

Juice Wrld - Goodbye & Good Riddance

2. "All Girls Are the Same"
3. "Lucid Dreams"
7. "Lean wit Me"
8. "I'll Be Fine" 
9. "Used to" 
10. "Candles" 
13. "I'm Still" 
14. "End of the Road"

2019

Iann Dior - Nothings Ever Good Enough

1. "18" 
2. "romance361" (featuring PnB Rock) 
3. "cutthroat"
4. "molly" (featuring Bernard Jabs)
5. "emotions"
6. "who cares"

Iann Dior - Industry Plant

3. "gone girl" (featuring Trippie Redd) 
5. "What Is Real" 
6. "Flowers" 
8. "Lately" 
11. "Searching" (featuring phem) 
15. "Stay For a While"

Aries - WELCOME HOME

4. "AMY'S GRAVE"
G-Eazy - B-Sides
2. "Bang" (featuring Tyga)

Lil Tecca - We Love You Tecca

1. "Ransom" 
2. "Shots" 
4. "Did It Again" 
7. "Bossanova" 
10. "Phenom" 
18. "Ransom (Remix)" (featuring Juice Wrld)

Juice Wrld - Death Race for Love

1. "Empty" 
8. "Robbery"
9. "Flaws and Sins"
10. "Feeling"
11. "Bandit" (with YoungBoy Never Broke Again)

Trippie Redd - A Love Letter to You 4

4. "Love Me More" 
7. "6 Kiss" (featuring Juice Wrld & YNW Melly) 
20. "Abandoned" (featuring Mariah the Scientist)

Post Malone - Hollywood's Bleeding

8. "On The Road" (featuring Meek Mill and Lil Baby)

Young Thug - So Much Fun

1. "Just How It Is"

Non-album singles

Lil Uzi Vert - "That's a Rack"

2020

Trippie Redd - A Love Letter to You 4 (Deluxe)

1. "I Love You" (featuring Chance the Rapper) 
4. "How I Was Raised" (featuring Lil Tecca)

Polo G - The Goat

10. "No Matter What"

Juice Wrld - Legends Never Die

5. "Righteous" 
7. "Smile" (with The Weeknd) 
8. "Tell Me U Luv Me" (with Trippie Redd) 
14. "Fighting Demons" 
16. "Screw Juice"

Internet Money - B4 the Storm (Complete Edition)

1. "Lemonade" (featuring  Gunna, Don Toliver & Nav)
2. "Blastoff" (featuring Juice Wrld & Trippie Redd) 
4. "Lemonade" (Remix) (featuring Don Toliver & Roddy Ricch)
5. "Thrusting" (featuring Swae Lee and Future) 
6. "Somebody" (featuring Lil Tecca & A Boogie wit da Hoodie) 
8. "JLO" (featuring Lil Tecca) 
9. "Giddy Up" (featuring Wiz Khalifa and 24KGoldn) 
12. "Really Redd" (featuring Trippie Redd, Lil Keed, Young Nudy) 
13. "Let You Down" (featuring TyFontaine & TheHxliday) 
15. "Block" (featuring Trippie Redd and StaySolidRocky) 
17. "Devastated" (featuring lilspirit)

Lil Tecca - Virgo World

11. "Insecurities" 
19. "Out of Love" (featuring Internet Money)

Machine Gun Kelly - Tickets to My Downfall
3. "Drunk Face"

Kodak Black - Bill Israel
6. "Pimpin Ain't Eazy"

2021

24KGoldn - El Dorado
2. "Company" 
4. "Outta Pocket" 
10. "Empty"

Juice WRLD - Goodbye & Good Riddance Anniversary Edition
2. "734" 
4. "Lucid Dreams Remix"

Polo G - Hall of Fame
13. "Zooted Freestyle"

Dro Kenji - F*CK YOUR FEELINGS
4. "LOVE YOU MOST" 
4. "DANGEROUS" 
8. "HADES" 
10. "LAMBO TRUCK" 
11. "EXPENSIVE"

The Kid LAROI - F*CK LOVE 3: OVER YOU
3. "LONELY AND F*CKED UP"

Juice WRLD - Fighting Demons
2. "Already Dead" (Juice WRLD) ( produced with DT)
11. "Feline" (Juice WRLD) (with Trippie Redd & Polo G) ( produced with DT & Haan)
12. "Relocate" (Juice WRLD) ( produced with DT)
15. "From My Window" (Juice WRLD) ( produced with Charlie Handsome)
18. "My Life In A Nutshell" (Juice WRLD)

glaive - all dogs go to heaven
1. "1984"

glaive and ericdoa - then i'll be happy
5. "physs"

JPRO - PMD2
1. "Pringle Chips"

PxnGuin - a hate note .
1. "A hate note ."

Matte Roxx! - SARAH
4. "MY BEAUTIFUL DARK TW!STED FANTASY!"

Moonkey, ARÓN & Gxra  - INFRAVALORADO
12. "MODO AVION"

2022

Internet Money - We All We Got -EP 
5.  "Codeine Cowboy" ([feat. Lil Yachty])

Non-Album Singles'
"His & Hers" - Internet Money (featuring Don Toliver, Gunna, and Lil Uzi Vert)  
"Flood My Wrist" - (A Boogie wit da Hoodie and Don Q (featuring Lil Uzi Vert)) 
"Memories" - (LORRREY) (produced with Sogimura)
"Whipski" ($NOT [feat. Lil Skies])
"LV Bags"- Xerld
"V12" (iann dior [feat. Lil Uzi Vert]) 
"Beautiful" (Rot Ken and SoFaygo) 
"FINDERS KEEPERS" (Dro Kenji and Scorey)

Awards and nominations

References

American hip hop record producers
People from Richmond County, Virginia
2000 births
Living people
Trap musicians
Emo rap musicians